Truncheon may refer to:
Club (weapon)
Baton (law enforcement)
Cutting (plant), means of plant propagation used by gardeners
, a British submarine commissioned during World War II and later sold to Israel
(Shaft of) a spear (obsolete usage, but found in Walter Scott, in Tolkien's Lord of the Rings and in Thomas Malory's Le Morte d'Arthur).